Gamlang Razi is possibly Southeast Asia's highest mountain, located in the northern Myanmar state of Kachin. It is in Khakaborazi National Park and part of the Himalayas. The mountain lies on the border of Myanmar and Tibet, 15 km from the border tri-point with India. The 5881-m high Hkakabo Razi is located 6.6 km ENE from Gamlang Razi. It has year-round snow and glaciers. Mt. Gamlang Razi rock type is granite, according to the Department of Geological Survey of Myanmar.

Climbing history
Andy Tyson (1968–2015) led the first ascent in 2013. The team consisted of five American climbers as well as two Burmese climbers from the Technical Climbing Club of Myanmar (TCCM). The expedition was mainly sponsored by the Htoo Foundation. The path to the base camp passes through several rainforests and crosses a number of streams. In favorable weather, it typically takes about two weeks to reach the base camp.

Possibly the highest peak in Southeast Asia
Gamlang Razi has been measured at 5,870 ±2 m (19,259 ft). It makes the highest mountain in Southeast Asia whose height has been measured exactly by GPS. Hkakabo Razi has not yet been measured via GPS. However, Hkakabo Razi may still be the highest peak according to a recent expedition to that peak. Though the expedition team reached only to 5742 m (18,840 ft), they estimated that Hkakabo Razi's summit to be another 240 m (800 ft) higher.

See also
List of mountains in Burma
List of Southeast Asian mountains
Khakaborazi National Park

References

External links
Gamlang Razi Myanmar's snow capped mountain in Kachin State

India–Myanmar border
International mountains of Asia
Mountains of Myanmar
Mountains of Tibet
Mountains of Arunachal Pradesh
Five-thousanders of the Himalayas